Brothers Gonna Work It Out is a compilation album by English big beat duo The Chemical Brothers, containing various artists' work mixed by the duo. It was released on 22 September 1998. The cover features a picture of Our Lady of Fatima church in Harlow, Essex, England. The quote "the brother's gonna work it out" comes from a track by Willie Hutch and is also featured in the duo's earlier track "Leave Home". It peaked at number 95 on the Billboard 200 chart. As of 2002 it has sold 165,000 copies in the United States according to Nielsen SoundScan. As of 1999 it has sold 400,000+ units worldwide, mostly in the US.

The Radio 1 Anti-Nazi Mix was the basis of what would later be released as Brothers Gonna Work It Out.

Track listing

Notes
  signifies an additional producer/remixer

References

The Chemical Brothers albums
DJ mix albums
1998 compilation albums
1998 remix albums
Astralwerks compilation albums
Virgin Records compilation albums